Sabrina Elaine Ionescu (born December 6, 1997) is an American professional basketball player for the New York Liberty of the Women's National Basketball Association (WNBA). She played college basketball for the Oregon Ducks. She is the NCAA all-time leader in career triple-doubles, the Pac-12 Conference all-time leader in assists, and the only NCAA Division I basketball player to record 2,000 points, 1,000 assists, and 1,000 rebounds in a career.

Early life 
Ionescu was born in Walnut Creek, California, to Romanian-American parents. Her father, Dan Ionescu, fled communist Romania around the time of the 1989 revolution, seeking political asylum in the United States. He hoped that his then-wife, Liliana Blaj, and their son Andrei could join them in a few months, but they were unable to move to the US until 1995. By that time, Dan owned a limousine service in Northern California, where he had chosen to settle because he had several extended family members in that area. Sabrina was around three years old when she first picked up a basketball. She has a twin brother Edward ("Eddy"), who was born 18 minutes after her. Eddy played basketball at the City College of San Francisco before transferring to Oregon; he was solely a student in the 2018–19 school year before walking on to the Ducks men's basketball team in 2019–20.

In a 2019 interview with Ava Wallace of The Washington Post, Ionescu admitted to being a "natural scorer", but said that most of the rest of her skill set came from playing alongside both boys and older girls in her childhood:

Ionescu attended a middle school that did not have enough players to field a girls' team, and her school refused to allow her to play on the boys' team. She recalled, "My middle school said I should be playing with dolls. Seriously, word-for-word." She responded by recruiting enough girls to enable her school to have a team.

High school career 

Ionescu was four-year varsity basketball letter winner at Miramonte High School in Orinda, California under head coach Kelly Sopak.

As a freshman in 2012–13, she started 14 of 29 games and averaged 13.8 points, 3.9 assists and 3.9 steals per game to help her team to a 27–3 record and a Northern California Section Division II runner-up finish.

As a sophomore in 2013–14, Ionescu helped her team to a 30–2 record.

During her junior year, Ionescu averaged 18.7 points, 7.7 rebounds, 4.2 assists and 4.7 steals per game, and helped Miramonte High School to a 30–2 record with an appearance in the CIF open division semifinals.

In her senior year, she led Miramonte to the CIF open division title game after averaging 25.3 points, 8.8 assists, 7.6 rebounds, 4.5 steals and 1.3 blocks per game. She posted a triple-double in the championship game loss to Chaminade with 24 points, 10 assists and 10 rebounds. Ionescu also made a first half buzzer beating shot from half court. She received national honors including the USA Today Girls Basketball Player of the Year, Max Preps Player of the Year, Cal-Hi Sports Ms. Basketball State Player of the Year and Gatorade State Player of the Year. Ionescu was named a McDonald's All-America and Jordan Brand All-American selection. She was named the McDonald's All-America game MVP after scoring a record 25 points, including seven three-pointers, with 10 rebounds.

Ionescu left Miramonte with a career win–loss record of 119–9 and a school-record 2,606 points scored. She is also the all-time leader in assists (769), steals (549) and triple-doubles (21). In addition to the career record, Ionescu also held the Miramonte top three single season scoring records with 598 (2013–14), 760 (2014–15) and 834 (2015–16). Ionescu also held the single-game scoring record of 43 points vs. Pinewood High School while being double- and triple-teamed and the single game record in assists with 19 at Dublin High School.

Ionescu was the No. 1 ranked point guard and No. 4 overall player in the recruiting class of 2016. According to Ava Wallace of The Washington Post, Ionescu chose Oregon "because she wanted to be the all-American at Oregon, not just an all-American somewhere else." At the time, she was the highest-ranked recruit ever to commit to Oregon basketball. However, she had difficulty making a college choice, not signing a National Letter of Intent with any school during either the early signing period in November 2015 or the late period in April 2016. Ionescu finally committed to Oregon just before the school's 2016 summer term began, driving with her father for 8 hours from their Bay Area home to Eugene, making an unannounced visit to Matthew Knight Arena and telling head coach Kelly Graves that she would join the team.

College career

Freshman season 
On November 13, 2016, Ionescu made her collegiate debut for Oregon, recording 11 points in an 84–67 win over Lamar. Ionescu recorded four triple-doubles, one shy of the Pac-12 record and two less than the NCAA record. She averaged 14.6 points, 6.6 rebounds and 5.5 assists per game, ranking second on the team in scoring and rebounding, and first in assists. She also posted seven double-doubles, ranked third in the Pac-12 and 29th in the NCAA with 183 assists on the year. Her 1.93-to-1 assist-to-turnover ratio was second-best in the Pac-12. She was named Pac-12 Freshman of Week four times and was named USBWA National Player of the Week. At the end of the regular season, she was named Pac-12 Freshmen of the Year and unanimous First Team All-Pac-12 and Pac-12 All-Freshman Team selection. Additionally, she was awarded the USBWA National Freshman of the Year presented by the United States Basketball Writers Association.

Sophomore season 
Ionescu rose to national prominence in her sophomore year, she led the Ducks to their third regular-season league crown all-time and first-ever No. 1 seed in the Pac-12 Women's Basketball Tournament.
She led the Pac-12 in scoring (19.2) and assists, dishing out 7.8 assists per game which was fifth-most in the country. She had 16 double-doubles this season and 14 20-point games. She has recorded 10-assist games 13 times this season, handing out a league season-high 14 twice. On February 26, 2018, Ionescu was named ESPNW's college basketball player of the week.  Following her second season, she was named the Pac-12 Conference Women's Basketball Player of the Year, and was also named a first team All-American by ESPN. Ionescu's Oregon Ducks also won the Pac-12 championship for the first time since 2000. She was named the winner of the Nancy Lieberman Award as the top Division I women's point guard after the season, and was also a finalist for the Naismith Award. Ionescu became NCAA women's all-time leader in triple-doubles, trailing only former BYU men's player Kyle Collinsworth (with 12) among all NCAA players.

Junior season 

On November 6, 2018, Ionescu recorded her 11th triple-double in a victory against Alaska-Fairbanks. Twelve days later, she would tie the NCAA triple-double record, with her 12th triple-double in a win against Buffalo. On December 20, 2018, Ionescu recorded her 13th triple-double in a game against Air Force and broke the NCAA triple-double record for both men's and women's basketball. She was later named ESPNW Player of the Week. Since that game on December 20, 2018, Ionescu has added five more triple-doubles for a season total of eight, and has broken the Oregon women's basketball assist record (formerly 608 assists) in a Pac-12 conference game against USC. In the 2019 NCAA Tournament, Ionescu leads the Ducks to their first Final Four appearance after their 88–84 victory over Mississippi State. Ionescu finished the game with 31 points, eight assists, seven rebounds and a steal. In the NCAA Tournament Final Four, the Ducks lost to the eventual national champion Baylor 72–67. Ionescu won almost all the possible National Player of the Year awards, including the John R. Wooden Award, Associated Press College Basketball Player of the Year, USBWA National Player of the Year, Naismith College Player of the Year, ESPY for Top Female College Athlete and ESPN.com National Player of the Year.

Despite having only played for three seasons at this point, Ionescu was eligible for the 2019 WNBA draft by age. Additionally, she would receive her bachelor's degree that June. However, believing that she had "unfinished business" at Oregon, she chose to come back for her senior season. This announcement came shortly after Ionescu accepted a place in a newly launched one-year master's degree program in brand creation in UO's School of Journalism and Communications.

Senior season 
In the second game of her senior season on November 13, 2019, Ionescu surpassed the 2,000 points, 800 assists mark for her college career with a 109–52 win over Utah State. She fell short of another triple-double with 16 points, 12 assists and 9 rebounds in the game but recorded her 2,012 career points and 810 career assists. In a win over then #3 Stanford (87–55), Ionescu scored a career high 37 points along with 11 rebounds and 7 assists, and broke Alison Lang's Oregon all-time career scoring record of 2,252 points in the third quarter. In the rivalry game against Oregon State on January 24, 2020, Ionescu had 24 points, 9 assists and 4 rebounds and broke Oregon State and NBA star Gary Payton's Pac-12 all-time record of 938 assists. Payton personally congratulated Ionescu on the achievement. On February 14, 2020, Ionescu recorded her 1,000th career assist in a game against #7 UCLA and joined Courtney Vandersloot as the only players in NCAA men's and women's basketball history with 2,000 plus points and 1,000 plus assists. Ten days later in the Ducks' 74–66 win at #4 Stanford, she became the first NCAA player ever with 2,000 points, 1,000 assists, and 1,000 rebounds in a career. Ionescu also recorded her eighth triple-double of the season, tying her own NCAA single-season record from last season. Earlier that day, she had been a featured speaker at the memorial service for Kobe Bryant, who had become a close personal friend within the previous two years, flying from Los Angeles to the Bay Area immediately after her speech.

On April 14, 2020, Ionescu was named the winner of the Honda Sports Award as the best collegiate female basketball player in the nation. Ionescu also won her second straight Naismith College Player of the Year award, Wade Trophy, Associated Press Women's College Basketball Player of the Year award, and USBWA Women's National Player of the Year award.

Impact at Oregon 
According to Ducks coach Kelly Graves, in 2019 Ionescu had "a chance to be a Marcus Mariota, that level of player and an esteemed Oregon Duck when it's all said and done." He noted that attendance at Oregon women's games had dramatically increased during Ionescu's career at the school. In the season before she arrived, the average announced home attendance for the Ducks was 1,501. Her sophomore season saw an average attendance of over 4,200; it went up to over 7,100 in her junior season and over 10,000 in her senior season. Ionescu was also a significant draw when Oregon went on the road; for example, when the Ducks visited Washington during her junior season, the crowd for that game was 3,000 more than the Huskies drew two nights earlier against Oregon State.

Graves' remarks about Ionescu's future iconic status at Oregon proved to be prophetic. Shortly after the premature end of her senior season, the university polled fans on social media, asking them to name the four Oregon alumni they would put on a notional Mount Rushmore for the university. According to a 2020 story in the university's web journal Around the O, more than 70 suggestions were provided, but the four top choices were Mariota, Steve Prefontaine, Phil Knight, and Ionescu. As the story's author Damian Foley put it,

Professional career

New York Liberty (2020–present) 
Because Ionescu turned 22 in December 2019 she was eligible to declare for the 2019 WNBA draft. A January 2019 mock draft by ESPN, incorporating input from WNBA personnel and ESPN women's basketball analysts, concluded that Ionescu was a possible top pick should she declare. However, Ionescu announced in an open letter published in The Players' Tribune on April 6, 2019, the day after Oregon's loss to Baylor in the Final Four and four days before the draft, that she would return to Oregon for her senior season.

On April 17, 2020, the New York Liberty selected Ionescu with the first overall pick in the 2020 WNBA Draft. She played her first game with the Liberty on July 25. In her second WNBA game on July 29 against the Dallas Wings, she recorded 33 points, 7 assists, and 7 rebounds in 34 minutes of play.

On August 1, 2020, Ionescu injured her left ankle in the second quarter against the Atlanta Dream. She was diagnosed the next day with a grade 3 sprain, and was expected to miss about one month while recovering. In the end, though, she did not play again for the remainder of her first professional season.

The next season, on May 18, 2021, Ionescu recorded her first professional triple-double. Scoring 26 points, 12 assists, and 10 rebounds, she became the youngest player in WNBA history to record a triple double. It was also the first Liberty triple-double, as well as the tenth in league history.

On July 6, 2022, Ionescu had 31 points, 13 rebounds and 10 assists to record the first 30-point triple-double in WNBA history.

Off the court
April 17, 2020 Nike, Inc. signs WNBA’s #1 overall pick, Sabrina Ionescu to multiyear endorsement deal which will include signature footwear and apparel.

November 11, 2022 New York Liberty guard, Sabrina Ionescu rejoins her alma mater as the director of athletic culture. 

November 14, 2022 Sabrina Ionescu makes Forbes 30 Under 30 list for Sports.

National team career 
In late April 2018, Ionescu and Oregon teammates Erin Boley, Otiona Gildon, and Ruthy Hebard entered the USA Basketball women's national 3x3 championship tournament at the United States Olympic Training Center in Colorado Springs, Colorado. Ionescu had never before played under FIBA 3x3 rules, admitting after the tournament, "I had to ask the rules before the games started." She adjusted quickly to the unfamiliar format, leading her team to the championship while going unbeaten and also being named tournament MVP. Ionescu and her Oregon teammates would be named as the US team for the 2018 3x3 World Cup to be held in June in the Philippines. At the World Cup, they were the youngest team in the field, but swept their pool, defeating Cup holders Russia along the way.

Career statistics

WNBA

Regular season 

|-
|2020
|New York
|3
|3
|26.6
|.452
|.350
|1.000
|4.7
|4.0
|0.7
|0.0
|4.3
|18.3
|-
|2021
|New York
|30
|26
|30.0
|.375
|.329
|.911
|5.7
|6.1
|0.6
|0.5
|3.2
|11.7
|-
|2022
|New York
|36
|36
|32.3
|.411
|.333
|.931
|7.1
|6.3
|1.1
|0.3
|3.0
|17.4
|-
|Career
|3 years, 1 team
|69
|65
|31.0
|.402
|.331
|.927
|5.5
|6.4
|0.9
|0.4
|3.2
|15.0
|}

Playoffs 

|-
|2021
|New York
|1
|1
|35.0
|.417
|.143
|1.000
|5.0
|11.0
|1.0
|0.0
|2.0
|14.0
|-
|2022
|New York
|3
|3
|31.0
|.531
|.400
|.750
|6.0
|4.3
|1.0
|0.3
|3.0
|14.3
|-
|Career
|2 years, 1 team
|4
|4
|32.0
|.500
|.318
|.857
|5.8
|6.0
|1.0
|0.3
|2.8
|14.3
|}

College 

|-
| style="text-align:left;"|2016–17
| style="text-align:left;"|Oregon
| 33 || 33 || 32.9 || .390 || .420 || .825 || 6.6 || 5.5 || 1.3 || .2 || 2.9 || 14.6
|-
| style="text-align:left;"|2017–18
| style="text-align:left;"|Oregon
| 38 || 38 || 35.6 || .468 || .438 || .805 || 6.7 || 7.8 || 1.7 || .3 || 3.0 || 19.7
|-
| style="text-align:left;"|2018–19
| style="text-align:left;"|Oregon
| 38 || 38 || 35.9 || .443 || .429 || .883 || 7.4 || 8.2 || 1.3 || .2 || 2.5 || 19.9
|-
| style="text-align:left;"|2019–20*
| style="text-align:left;"|Oregon
| 33 || 33 || 33.7 || .518 || .392 || .921 || 8.6 || 9.1 || 1.5 || .3 || 3.0 || 17.5
|- class="sortbottom"
| style="text-align:center;" colspan="2"|College Totals
| 142 || 142 || 34.6 || .455 || .422 || .851 || 7.3 || 7.7 || 1.5 || .3 || 2.8 || 18.0

* 2020 NCAA tournament canceled due to COVID-19 pandemic

Personal life 
Ionescu is a Christian. She was close with Kobe Bryant, with whom she had one-on-one training sessions, and spoke at the Kobe & Gianna Bryant Celebration of Life at the Staples Center on February 24, 2020. Ionescu is also very close friends with former teammate Ruthy Hebard.

Ionescu is engaged to former Oregon football player and Las Vegas Raiders center Hroniss Grasu.

See also 
 List of NCAA Division I basketball career triple-doubles leaders
 List of NCAA Division I women's basketball career assists leaders

References

External links 
 Oregon Ducks bio
 USA Basketball profile
 
 

1997 births
Living people
All-American college women's basketball players
American people of Romanian descent
American women's 3x3 basketball players
American women's basketball players
Basketball players at the 2019 Pan American Games
Pan American Games 3x3 basketball players
Basketball players from California
James E. Sullivan Award recipients
McDonald's High School All-Americans
Medalists at the 2019 Pan American Games
Miramonte High School alumni
New York Liberty draft picks
New York Liberty players
Oregon Ducks women's basketball players
Pan American Games gold medalists for the United States
Pan American Games medalists in basketball
Point guards
Sportspeople from Walnut Creek, California
American twins
Twin sportspeople
Women's National Basketball Association All-Stars
Women's National Basketball Association first-overall draft picks